Bhoomi may refer to:

 Bhūmi, Hindu goddess
 Bhoomi (band), a band in Kolkata, India
 Bhoomi (2017 film), a film by director Omung Kumar
 Bhoomi (2021 film), a Tamil-language film
 Boomi (software), a land records automation solution
 Bhoomi, an Indian environmental television series aired on Doordarshan

See also
 Bhumi (disambiguation)